Roger Hill (1545–1608) was an English politician.

He was a Member (MP) of the Parliament of England for Plympton Erle in 1571 and for Taunton in 1572.

References

1545 births
1608 deaths
Members of the Parliament of England for Plympton Erle
English MPs 1571
English MPs 1572–1583